Faroe Islands competed at the 2020 Summer Paralympics in Tokyo, Japan, from 24 August to 5 September 2021.

Athletics 

Track

See also
 Faroe Islands at the Paralympics

References

Nations at the 2020 Summer Paralympics
2021 in Faroese sport
2020